María Laura Prieto Villella (born November 21, 1985, in Montevideo, Uruguay) is an Uruguayan-born Chilean model, singer, actress, dancer and personality of the Chilean television. She currently lives in Santiago de Chile.

Personal life
Prieto was born in Montevideo, Uruguay and decided to move to Chile when she was 16 years old, she studied theater and has a daughter named Tabata, who was born when Prieto was 19 years old, Laura and Tabata's father separated shortly after the birth.
Prieto says she was thirteen when she began her career due to the support of her brother, who died that year.

"My brother told me I had to be a model and took me to auditions. What he loved the most was that I was a model. I began at thirteen."

Career
Prieto began her career at the age of 13 years, attending a modeling course and various castings. She comes to television through El último pasajero as a model or flight attendant, later arrived at the TV show Calle 7 on January 12, 2009, where she continues in 2010.

Prieto participated in the Calle 7 record produced by Rigeo in which she would sing two songs, one of them with Maite Orsini. In March 2010, Prieto took part in the campaign Chile helps Chile where she sang her song I'm your girl. She also starred in the mini-series Amores de Calle as Luciana. More late work at the TV show Yingo, in Chilevision channel.

She has developed a modeling career for the agency New Models; also has over a hundred fashion shows, photo shoots and advertising campaigns. She also works as an event entertainer.Laura en Toco city
In 2009, she was the main model in the music video Lady, song of DJ Mendez. It was recorded in Stockholm, Sweden and released by Via-X and TVN, during a stage of promotion of "Lady" in early November 2009.

 Filmography 

Discography
 I'm your baby (2009)
 I go crazy'' (duet with Maite Orsini) (2010)

See also
 Contestants of Calle 7
 Valeria Ortega Schettino
 Francisco "Chapu" Puelles
 Maite Orsini
 Valentina Roth

References

1985 births
Living people
People from Montevideo
Uruguayan expatriates in Chile
Uruguayan female models
21st-century Uruguayan women singers
Naturalized citizens of Chile